Greenwood is an unincorporated community in Charles Mix County, in the U.S. state of South Dakota.

History
A post office called Greenwood was established in 1859, and remained in operation until 1965. The community was named for a grove of trees near the original town site.

References

Unincorporated communities in Charles Mix County, South Dakota
Unincorporated communities in South Dakota